Memphis Municipal Airport  is a city-owned public use airport located one nautical mile (1.85 km) northeast of the central business district of Memphis, a city in Hall County, Texas, United States.

Facilities and aircraft 
It has two runways: 17/35 is 4,670 by 75 feet (1,423 x 23 m) with an asphalt pavement and 8/26 is 2,750 by 70 feet (838 x 21 m) with a turf surface. For the 12-month period ending April 1, 2007, the airport had 2,300 general aviation aircraft operations, an average of 191 per month.

References

External links 
 

Airports in Texas
Buildings and structures in Hall County, Texas
Transportation in Collingsworth County, Texas
Transportation in Hall County, Texas